Skylab II was a space station concept proposed in 2013 by the Advanced Concepts Office of NASA Marshall Space Flight Center, to be located at the Earth-Moon L2 Lagrangian point. Proposed by NASA contractor Brand Griffin, Skylab II would have been constructed as a "wet workshop" using a spent upper-stage hydrogen fuel tank from the Space Launch System (SLS), much as the Skylab was originally planned to be built "wet" from the spent bipropellant tanks of the Saturn S-IVB upper stage. If constructed, Skylab II would have been the first crewed outpost located beyond the orbit of the Moon.

Space station design
Given its location far away from the nearest food, water, and air, the first iteration of the space station would have had to have been able to support a four-person crew for 60 days on one shipment of supplies, to be eventually improved to 180 days. As Skylab II would be built from an SLS hydrogen fuel tank, the costs of assembly were estimated at a relatively low $2 billion, a tremendous savings over a previously projected cost of $4.175 billion for a similar space station.

The space station would have large modules with diameters of —much larger than the  diameter of International Space Station modules or the  diameter of the original Skylab. This large interior volume, in turn, would make Skylab II suitable for its deep-space location, where resupply missions would be rare and astronauts would have to store the food they received from each mission for months at a time. The supplies themselves could be carried in a variety of vehicles, such as the existing Progress and Dragon, or perhaps a new, SLS-derived logistics module, which could resupply the whole station in one mission.

Potential uses
Once at Earth-Moon L2, Skylab II could be a "stepping stone" for further human exploration in the Solar System, for example by being a docking site for a crewed lunar lander before the trip to the Moon. The second use would be to add a servicing capability for the astrophysics missions located near Earth-Sun L2, extending the cryogenic mission lifetime of such missions by continually refilling their liquid helium and enabling some astrophysics missions which may otherwise have not been possible or would have been launched in a less-capable state.

For extravehicular activities (EVAs) near the space station, a small, one-person FlexCraft may be used in lieu of a spacesuit to improve dexterity and safety for astronauts, as well as the efficiency of EVAs. FlexCraft would eliminate the requirement of an astronaut to prebreathe the pure oxygen atmosphere in a spacesuit, reducing overhead time for EVAs significantly and enabling longer EVAs to be carried out. Additionally, FlexCraft would improve astronaut speed during EVAs, as moving around space installations would be faster and less physically demanding in automated vehicles.

See also 

 Lunar Gateway – a station under development , intended to take up a near-rectilinear halo orbit about the Moon

References

External links 
 NASA Marshall Space Flight Center Advanced Concepts Office
 Space Launch System infographic

Proposed space stations